K149 or K-149 may refer to:

K-149 (Kansas highway), a state highway in Kansas
HMCS Brandon (K149), a former Canadian Navy ship